Fernando Amorsolo (1892–1972) was a Filipino painter.

It may also refer to:
Pablo Amorsolo (1898–1945), Filipino painter, younger brother of Fernando
Sylvia Amorsolo-Lazo (born 1943), Filipino painter, daughter of Fernando
Amorsolo Street, a minor north-south roadway in Makati, Metro Manila, Philippines
The Beacon – Amorsolo Tower, a planned residential condominium skyscraper in Makati, Philippines